Jeffrey Craig Fenholt (September 15, 1950 – September 10, 2019) was an American musician, singer and actor best known for his performance as the title character in the original Broadway theatre adaptation of Jesus Christ Superstar and for his appearance on the cover of Time. In later years, Fenholt gained recognition as a Christian evangelist and singer, as well as controversy over his involvement with the English heavy metal band Black Sabbath.

Background and early years
Fenholt grew up in Ohio and went to school in Columbus, Ohio. He was involved with a number of rock bands and performed at various school functions. Fenholt got his first regional hit recording titled "Goin' Too Far" with the band The Fifth Order when he was 14. He toured extensively while he was in high school. By his own admission, he was a troubled youth with a juvenile delinquency record. Fenholt attended Ohio State University for two years on a music scholarship, and later earned his B.A. in music at The School of Bible Theology University in San Jacinto, California.

Fenholt was cast as Jesus in the original Broadway production of Jesus Christ Superstar at the Mark Hellinger Theatre. Jesus Christ Superstar (JCS) sold in excess of 12 million albums. The album recording, however, didn't feature Fenholt in the title role but Ian Gillan, known from the British group Deep Purple. JCS cast members Carl Anderson and Yvonne Elliman toured with Fenholt on the JCS world tour as Judas Iscariot and Mary Magdalene, respectively.

Fenholt released several solo recordings, including a successful cover of Graham Nash's "Simple Man" (not to be confused with Lobo's "A Simple Man," which was released at nearly the same time).

Fenholt co-founded Entertainment Capital Corporation with Jeff Thornburg, former president of The Robert Stigwood Org, producing Andy Warhol's film, Bad. ECC also produced recordings for Fenholt. Thornburg and Fenholt amicably parted ways when Thornburg accepted the position of head of venture capital for Paramount Pictures.
  
In 1978, Fenholt recorded a disco LP titled Smile for CBS and was paid $300,000. Fenholt also recorded for Capitol Records, Universal, Paramount, Polygram, Polydor, Decca, RCA, and as a youth, Laurie, Diamond and Cameo Parkway. He last recorded for Sony.

In 1983, Fenholt moved across the country to Southern California to pursue music, but this time it was for rock and roll. During this period, Fenholt would record demos in the studio with Tony Iommi and members of Black Sabbath as a lead vocalist, but his departure from the group would take place before joining officially. Fenholt was also the lead singer of a number of other rock groups in his lifetime, such as "Driver" which featured members of Ozzy Osbourne, Whitesnake, and Dio.

Fenholt's 1994 autobiography, From Darkness to Light, reveals that he was abused and mistreated as a youth and subjected to frequent beatings. In 1996, Fenholt's parents sued him, Trinity Broadcasting Network (TBN), and the publisher of his autobiography for $12 million each for defamation of character. Fenholt's siblings claimed he made up the stories of abuse, but the lawsuit subsequently was dropped after Fenholt produced court documents from the superior court of Franklin County, Ohio, confirming his claims. Fenholt later said that he had a "warm relationship" with his mother and family.

Conversion to Christianity
According to Fenholt's autobiography, he was heavily addicted to alcohol and drugs following the end of [[Jesus Christ Superstar#Original Broadway production|Jesus Christ Superstar'''s run on Broadway]]. Fenholt's often-repeated testimony (later published in his autobiography) details a visit from Christian construction workers (Nick Dissipio, owner, hired by his Christian wife to rebuild a wing of his house) who confronted him regarding his portrayal of Christ on stage. Fenholt converted to Christianity, abstained from his addictions, spent the next several years struggling to balance his faith and his career, and then became a high-profile personality on TBN. Fenholt sported long hair, an unusual style in conservative evangelical circles, and he often appeared with his wife Maureen (nicknamed Reeni).

His ministry went global, with tours and concerts in Italy, South Africa (including one tour with his daughter Shaye), Australia, New Zealand, South and Central America, and Europe. The international trip to Moscow, Russia in the Olympic Stadium took place with approximately 100,000 people in attendance in communist Russia.

In 1989, Jeff Fenholt would return to the very same theater where it all started with Jesus Christ Superstar—the Mark Hellinger Theater, but this time it was to dedicate the theater as a new evangelical Pentecostal church in Times Square pastored by David Wilkerson called "Times Square Church".

In 1996, Fenholt was Chairman of Youth for a rally called "Washington for Jesus" which took place at the Nation's Capitol, and is reported as drawing nearly 500,000 people.

His TBN show, Highway to Heaven (not to be confused with the Michael Landon series), was aired around the world and reached millions. Fenholt also had a national and world-wide musical TV program called Standing on the Rock, which aired over 36 satellites covering most of the world. TBN also recorded some of Fenholt's self-composed solo worship albums. His Christian music sold in excess of 3.5 million albums, and his Christmas Classics album went platinum. In total, Jeff Fenholt received a double-platinum album for Jesus Christ Superstar, plus an additional platinum album and two gold albums in the gospel genre.

Involvement with Tony Iommi/Black Sabbath
Fenholt built his career as a TBN personality based mostly upon his involvement with Jesus Christ Superstar and Black Sabbath. In the Black Sabbath biography publication Never Say Die, Fenholt said that Black Sabbath manager Don Arden informed him he was singing for Black Sabbath.

The Never Say Die book, written by Garry Sharpe-Young and updated as Sabbath Bloody Sabbath – The Battle for Black Sabbath, states that a substantial number of recordings were made during Fenholt's time with the group. It is acknowledged that this was a confusing time in the band's history, as singer David Donato had left the band after six months, only having recorded demos. Geezer Butler and Bill Ward had left as well, leaving Tony Iommi as the sole original member.

Manager Don Arden suggested Iommi use Fenholt and tracks were written, mainly by Iommi and Nicholls, for a proposed new album. The book Never Say Die voices opinion from other band members that Fenholt might have been kept in the dark about plans to make an Iommi solo album. Geoff Nicholls has stated that after Fenholt's departure, Iommi wanted to use different singers, including David Coverdale, Steve Marriott, Glenn Hughes, and Rob Halford.

Fenholt says several of his melodies were used in songs that appeared on Seventh Star (and subsequently did not receive credit for them). None of his lyrics were used, as confirmed by comparing the Fenholt demos with the album. Rumors suggesting he only left the project because of supposed personal conflicts with the lyrical material being written and his religious faith are suggested by Fenholt and Geoff Nicholls, who wrote the lyrics. Fenholt claims it was in fact a physical argument with Don Arden, along with Iommi's bad habits and Tony's proposed dark lyrics that caused his departure. However, Iommi has stated that Fenholt was never an official member of Black Sabbath. Iommi went on to say that he thought Fenholt had a great voice, but it didn't work, due to Fenholt having difficulty in singing "Sabbath" type lyrics and fitting in.

During this period, Fenholt would also audition and record demos with Geezer Butler for his proposed Geezer Butler Band project which never got off the ground.

After his time with Iommi, Fenholt would briefly replace Jeff Scott Soto in Driver, a joint project of Rudy Sarzo and Tommy Aldridge (each of Ozzy and Whitesnake fame). Upon recording several cuts with Driver (one of which, "Rock the World," is in common circulation amongst fans), Fenholt left the project to do a solo tour of South America and was replaced by his successor in Joshua, Rob Rock. Following a legal dispute with another band of the same name, Driver changed its name to M.A.R.S., and guitarist Tony MacAlpine joined the project. The band released only one album, 1986's Project: Driver, before they officially disbanded.

Fenholt continued as a solo Christian artist to perform numerous American and world tours in stadiums and arenas, often drawing in excess of 100,000 in attendance.

Departure

In 1993, Fenholt announced on the TV program The 700 Club that he planned to do a Halloween concert in an arena in Mount Horeb, Wisconsin. Having advance notification from the attorney general of Massachusetts of his arrival in Wisconsin, Wiccan Priest Selena Fox (Circle Sanctuary) got a restraining order from the local county court prohibiting not only his trespass on private property but actually specifying that he stay a particular distance from the property line. Fenholt won in court.

In 1996, Fenholt was the chairman of a youth rally titled Washington for Jesus on the steps of the U.S. Capitol, drawing nearly 500,000 in attendance. Fenholt raised over $1.7 million to stage the event, donating over $300,000 of his own funds.

An article in the December 1997 issue of Vanity Fair reviewing Ian Gibson's biography of Salvador Dalí, detailed Fenholt's past as a "boy toy" for Dalí's wife Gala Dalí.  The article by John Richardson was titled "Dali's Demon Bride" and was unsparing in its criticism of both Gala and her husband.  The article was not much more kind to Fenholt than it was to Gala; according to the review, Fenholt became Gala's lover when she was in her eighties, and secured in return "a sizable house on Long Island... and large sums of money."  Fenholt was outraged at the depiction of Gala, and wrote a scathing letter to the editor, stating the authors had no evidence to substantiate their depiction of Gala Dalí.  

Fenholt was divorced in 1998 and left TBN, except for a few brief appearances, including one after the events of September 11, 2001, that featured a marked change in his demeanor and appearance, including short hair and a quick exit from the stage following his performance. His album of Christian music was TBN's promotion in December 2001. Fenholt recorded five solo albums for TBN, featuring many of his own compositions. These sold in excess of 3.3 million copies. Fenholt earned one Platinum and two Gold albums. He briefly was seen doing a late-night timeslot for a half-hour program. Fenholt stated that after his divorce he had "lost his fire".

Fenholt returned to TBN on March 3, 2004, as a guest on Behind the Scenes, hosted by Paul Crouch. Fenholt mentioned Black Sabbath, citing the book Never Say Die.

In 2008, Fenholt was hired as executive producer of the Beijing Olympic concert series.

Personal life
Jeffrey Craig Fenholt was born on September 15, 1950, in Columbus, Ohio, to parents Robert and Janet Fenholt. He has a brother named Tom, and two sisters, Nancy and Melinda. He also has one foster brother, Bill.

Fenholt married Maureen (Reeni) McFadden at age 20 and was married for 28 years. He has six adult children: Shaye, Tristan, Nissa, William, Amory, and Jeffrey.

Fenholt died of natural causes at his residence on September 10, 2019. A memorial service was held at The Rock in Anaheim, California, on September 28, 2019. The service was attended by family and friends, members of the original Broadway cast of Jesus Christ Superstar, as well as former bandmates associated with Ozzy Osbourne, Whitesnake, and Dio. Pastors and ministers across the country also attended.

In popular culture

Fenholt is portrayed by Zachary Nachbar-Seckel in Mary Harron's biopic Daliland''. The film depicts him as Gala Dali's self-centered lover, on whom she spends large amounts of money to support his fledgling solo career.

References

External links 

1951 births
2019 deaths
American evangelists
American heavy metal singers
American male singers
American performers of Christian music
Black Sabbath members
Converts to Christianity
Joshua (band) members
People from Columbus, Ohio
Place of birth missing
Place of death missing